Conflenti is a  and town in the province of Catanzaro in the Calabria region of southern Italy.

It is located at the foot of the Reventino mountain.

Conflenti is a small town in the province of Catanzaro, located at 540 m. above sea level, at the ground of Mount Reventino (1417 m. ).

Conflenti appears in the beautiful wall map of the Belvedere Gallery in the Vatican depicting Calabria Citeriore, part of the spectacular cycle of map frescoes made in 1580 by Egnazio Danti..........

Is this proof that Conflenti late ' 500 had strategic importance on the borderline between Calabria Citeriore and Ultra and was a religious reference place.......

The first housing core arose in the th century around a Basilian cenobium, then transformed into a Christian church named S. Nicola. Nicola. It developed in the following centuries until it became famous in 1578, the year when the wonders and appearances of the Virgin Mary happened in the place where today a beautiful sanctuary rises. Divided into Conflent soprano and subtains, it preserves almost intact the two historic centers with the distinctive gates and stone houses attached to each other like the niches of a hive.

At the end of ' 700 it was at the heart of the upsetting events of sanfedism by Nicola Gualtieri Panedigrano, who became major in the Bourbon army and right arm of Cardinal Ruffo in the march of Saint Faith to liberate the kingdom from the French.......

It was then one of the largest universities (today's municipalities) with a territory that reached the vicinity of the lametine plateau. The two tenants (Don Antonio Montoro and Don Antonio Folino) who held the possessions of the ancient abbey of the Saint Forty Martyrs, including the Selva del Mitoio and the church. The prosecutor of Abbey and its assets was the priest Don Francesco Maria Stranges, parish priest of St. Nicholas church in Conflenti soprano. The prosecution was entrusted to him by Abbot Commendatario Don Guglielmo Winspeare resident of Naples........

The Mythio forest was the famous ′′ pitch selva ′′ remembered in all the documents of the time.

In the years of the plague, Conflenti came to find himself at the center of attention for a series of puzzling events that made news throughout the Kingdom of Naples and even in the Vatican. These events (appearances and miracles) have been handed down, as well as tradition, from a precious manuscript of the era, including the dossier drawn up by the notary chancellor Nicolangelo Baratta in 1578-1579, when he was appointed Bishop of Martirano, Perblessedetti to ascertain Their truthfulness, instructing a true process. From this manuscript the priest Carlo Montoro in 1862 brought the SACRE MEMORIES OF GOD'S GRAN MOTHER in which appearances are narrated starting June 7, 1578.

The stories made by them to the Bishop's Chancellor Baratta have many particulars in common, so much so that all appearances are essentially identical: ′′ a great lady surrounded by doves ", ′′ a noble matron surrounded by angels ", ′′ a celesta majestic reigns ", ′′ a noble lady ", ′′ a heavenly matron ", ′′ a vague noble lady ". All seers, besides their vision, feel a ′′ heavenly soft harmony ′′ and go into ecstasy. For everyone the Virgin Mary has the same message: the request for the erection of a temple in Visora.

The laying of the first stone of the temple wanted by the Conflentes in Visora took place on March 9, 1580. Amid a multitude of faithful people from all sides, the bishop, after celebrating the mass and delivering a short speech, outlined the boundaries of the church. The foundations, as the documents read, were excavated in just 4 days. Work proceeded with incredible speed. Thus, after just seven months, precisely in October, the structures were finished.

Thereafter he was worried about painting a picture of the Virgin Mary to be placed in the new temple. The painter Muzio Roblani of Messina was given the assignment. On the morning of July 9, 1581 the painter, who arrived in Conflenti, went to church together with a commission to decide how to prepare and where to fix the effigy. Well, as tradition tells us, just opened the temple door, the picture already painted and put in place was found. The fact tasted miraculous.

The picture, immediately defined as ′′ divine ", placed very high above the high altar, a canvas of m. 1 by cm 80. The image of the Virgin, wrapped in a blue mantle that descends from the head to the back, stands out against a golden background. The colorful face is dark, blond hair, dark pupils, purple red lips. The mantle, tight forward, leaves the hands that shake a white embroidered linen free. On the chest to the right, a star is camping. A series of five-to-five gold globes adorn the rest of the cloth. On the left, in the arms of the Virgin, sits the child holding a book in his left hand, while with the right he blesses. A gold-colored double tiadem surrounds the mother and son's head. The Virgin depicted in this picture, defined as miraculous and painted by angels, was chosen as protector and patroness of the Conflentes who pledged to keep a lamp lit night and day in front of her altar. The feast of the Virgin Mary of Visora was celebrated on June 24 and it was for another 27 years. On 26 August 1607 the church was proclaimed and consecrated 'basilica', which involved great honorific privileges.

People

 Antonio Porchia

External links
 News, photos, recent history
 Conflenti Hystory: the history of Conflenti and its Families

Cities and towns in Calabria